This is a glossary for the terminology applied in the foundations of quantum mechanics and quantum metaphysics, collectively called quantum philosophy, a subfield of philosophy of physics.

Note that this is a highly debated field, hence different researchers may have different definitions on the terms.

Physics

Non-classical properties of quantum mechanics 
 nonseparability

 See also: entangled

 Nonlocality
 Superposition of states
 See also: Schrödinger's cat

Quantum phenomena 
 decoherence
 uncertainty principle
 See also: Einstein and the quantum
 entanglement
 See also: Bell's theorem, EPR paradox and CHSH inequality
 quantum teleportation
 superselection rule
 quantum erasure
 delayed choice experiment
 Quantum Zeno effect
 premeasurement
 ideal measurement

Suggested physical entities 
 hidden variables
 ensemble

Terms used in the formalism of quantum mechanics 
 Born's rule
 collapse postulate
 measurement
 relative state
 decoherent histories

Metaphysics 
 objective and subjective
 ontic and epistemic
 intrinsic and extrinsic
 agnostic
 Philosophical realism
 determinism
 causality
 empiricism
 rationalism
 scientific realism
 psychophysical parallelism

Interpretations of quantum mechanics 

List of interpretations:
 Bohmian Mechanics
 de Broglie–Bohm theory
 consistent histories
 Copenhagen interpretation
 conventional interpretation
 Usually refer to the Copenhagen interpretation.
 Ensemble Interpretation
 Everett interpretation
 See relative-state interpretation.
 hydrodynamic interpretation
 Ghirardi–Rimini–Weber theory (GRW theory / GRW effect)
 many-worlds interpretation
 many-minds interpretation
 many-measurements interpretation
 modal interpretations
 objective collapse theory
 orthodox interpretation
 Usually refer to the Copenhagen interpretation.
 Penrose interpretation
 Pilot wave
 Quantum logic
 relative-state interpretation
 relational quantum mechanics
 stochastic interpretation
 transactional interpretation

Uncategorized items 
 quantum Darwinism
 completeness
 relativistic measurement theory
 consciousness and observer role
 quantum correlation
 quantum indeterminism
 stochastic collapse
 pointer state
 quantum causality
 postselection
 entropy
 quantum cosmology

People 

Early researchers (before the 1950s):
 Max Born
 Albert Einstein
 Niels Bohr
 J. S. Bell
 Hugh Everett III
 David Bohm

1950s–2010s:
 Roland Omnès
 W. H. Zurek
 Erich Joos
 Max Tegmark
 Maximilian Schlosshauer
 H. D. Zeh
 David Deutsch
 Robert B. Griffiths
 Bernard d'Espagnat

See also 
 time arrow
 quantum chaos
 probability interpretations
 relative frequency approach
 probability theory as extended logic, decision theory
 history of quantum mechanics

Further reading

External links 
 https://web.archive.org/web/20121004044323/http://users.ox.ac.uk/~mert0130/teaching/qmreading.doc
 Philosophy of Physics - A guide for the aspiring researcher
 Quantum Mechanics (Stanford Encyclopedia of Philosophy)

Quantum mechanics
quantum philosophy, Glossary of
Wikipedia glossaries using description lists